Sartorio may refer to:

Three brothers from Venice:
Antonio Sartorio (1630–1680), Venetian composer
Gasparo Sartorio (1625–1680), Venetian composer
Girolamo Sartorio (died 1707), Venetian architect
Antoine Sartorio (1885–1988), French sculptor
Giulio Aristide Sartorio (1860–1932), Italian painter

See also
Museo Sartorio, Trieste

Italian-language surnames